Kalaveti Ravouvou (born 6 June 1998) is a Fijian rugby union player, currently playing for the . His preferred position is centre.

Professional career
Ravouvou was named in the Fijian Drua squad for the 2022 Super Rugby Pacific season.

References

External links
itsrugby.co.uk Profile

1998 births
Living people
Fijian rugby union players
Rugby union centres
Fijian Drua players
Fiji international rugby union players